Yilgarn is a large craton which constitutes the bulk of the Western Australian land mass.

Yilgarn may also refer to:
 Shire of Yilgarn, an administrative area in Western Australia
 Yilgarn Land District, a land district in Western Australia
 Electoral district of Yilgarn (1894-1930), a former electoral district of Western Australia

See also
 Australian gold rushes#1887 The Yilgarn and 1888 Southern Cross
 Electoral district of Merredin-Yilgarn (1950-2008), a former electoral district of Western Australia
 Electoral district of Yilgarn-Coolgardie (1930-1950), a former electoral district of Western Australia
 Electoral district of Yilgarn-Dundas (1977-1983), a former electoral district of Western Australia
 Northern Yilgarn, an area in Western Australia
 Yilgarn Star Gold Mine